Richard Lowther (1638–1703), English landowner at Maulds Meaburn, was the second son of Sir John Lowther, 1st Baronet, and Mary Fletcher.

He received the estate at Maulds Meaburn from his father, and was Member of Parliament for Appleby from 1689 to 1690.

Lowther married Barbara Prickett and had two sons:
Richard Lowther, no issue
Robert Lowther (1681–1745), Governor of Barbados

References
Lowther pedigree 2

History of Parliament

English MPs 1689–1690
1638 births
1703 deaths
Younger sons of baronets
English landowners
Richard